WBF may refer to:

International organisations
The World Backgammon Federation, the international body for backgammon
The World Badminton Federation, a governing body in badminton
The World Banana Forum, an initiative to promote sustainable production and trade
The World Baptist Fellowship, a Christian organization
The World Bodybuilding Federation, a defunct bodybuilding organization
The World Bodypainting Festival, a bodypainting festival
The World Boxing Federation
The World Branding Forum, a global nonprofit branding industry organization
The World Bridge Federation, a governing body in contract bridge
The World Business Forum, a global summit for business executives

Other uses
The WoodenBoat Forum, an online forum where people discuss wooden boats and other subjects
The Windows Biometric Framework, support for fingerprint biometric devices. See Features new to Windows 7.